Gert Heerkes (born 3 November 1965) is a Dutch football manager who is the assistant manager of Norwegian side Rosenborg's reserve team.

He has been in charge of professional teams Willem II, Heracles Almelo and SC Veendam, and also served as assistant coach at SC Heerenveen during the 2009–10 season.

References 

1965 births
Living people
Dutch football managers
Eredivisie managers
Heracles Almelo managers
Willem II (football club) managers
SC Veendam managers
FC Emmen managers
People from Hardenberg
SC Heerenveen non-playing staff
Sportspeople from Overijssel
Dutch expatriate sportspeople in China
Dutch expatriate sportspeople in Norway
Rosenborg BK non-playing staff